Katuheng (also Romanized as Katūheng; also known as Katūhīng) is a village in Gowharan Rural District, Gowharan District, Bashagard County, Hormozgan Province, Iran. At the 2006 census, its population was 41, in 12 families.

References 

Populated places in Bashagard County